Andriy Mykhaylyk (born 6 April 1957, Kiev, Ukrainian SSR) is a film director, journalist, author, cameraman, and publicist.

Education and career 
Mykhalyk received a bachelor's degree in engineering from the Kiev Polytechnic Institute and then gained employment in a number of occupations such as, metal working, design engineering, sports tourism, building and civil service.

In 1987, Mykhaylyk entered a career in journalism. By 1991, he had been published. Mykaylyk also gained employment as a television reporter, presenter on television and film, cameraman and director. At the Eco-Ukraine Association, Mykhaylyk became editor-in-chief of the television program, Zelena Studia. At the Chernobyl Information Agency, he became the author and presenter of the television program, Nadzvychaina sytuatsia. He also took the role of editor-in-chief of the television broadcasts of Verkhovna Rada.

In February 2001, Mykhaylyk travelled to India to cover the Gujarat earthquake. He was embedded with a Ukrainian mobile hospital where he worked as a reporter, cameramen, photographer and rescuer.

In November and December 2004, Mykhaylyk led a team filming events in the Ukrainian parliament. His work was broadcast as a daily program called No Comments which was part of the Parliamentary record on R.A.D.A., the Ukrainian parliament television channel.

Mykhaylyk also reported many items relating to consequences of the Chernobyl catastrophe. One item, for example, was the history and use of the Chernobyl shelter which he documented in the film The Den for a Nuclear Beast.

Awards 
 2001: Ukraine Ministry of Emergencies and Affairs of Population Protection award, second class, for courage in an emergency (the Chernobyl disaster). 
 2002: Parliamentary journalism competition (laureate). 
 2005: Ukraine Verkhovna Rada diploma. 
 2007: Fifth International Festival of Screen Arts (Kinotur), nomination for the rescue services documentary, Knights of Mountains

Television work 
 1996: Opening of the Community Ecology Centre.
 1998: Region for NART television company. 
 2000 to 2002: Safety ABC for the Chornobyl Information Agency.
 2006 to 2007: Objective for RADA. 
 2007 to 2008: Diplomacy World for RADA.
 2008 to 2009: That’s the way it is.

Filmography 

 1997: Dum spiro spero - the Carpathian mountains – the green lungs of Europe
 1998: Paradise on the Northern coast - the Black Sea Biosphere Reserve
 1998: Blue Eyes of the Volyn Region
 1998: Granite
 1999: Kaniv Natural Reserve
 2000: The Solar System
 2001: Letters from India
,
 2001: The Den for a Nuclear Beast
 2001: Dnipro - lessons from Chernobyl
 2002: Origins of Independence - Breath of Fire from Kholodnyi Yar
 2002: Ukrainian Taxpayers Association
 2002: Prevent to avoid rescue
 2002: Disaster won’t catch them out
 2002: Examined - no mines
 2002: Training has been successful
 1996 to 2003: Where the river Uzh begins
 1997 to 2003: Blue Whirlpools of the Carpathian Mountains 
 2003: The Roads of Anatolii Rakhanskyi
 2004: Gold of the Silver Land (Zakarpattia's forestry issues)
 2004: Saki - a city of Sun 
 2004: Episodes of the Parliamentary Chronicle 
 2005: From maidan to maidan
 2005: Nineteen years of the Chernobyl disaster
 2006: Week end, Zakarpattia style
 2006: Chernobyl Spring 
 2006: Where the whisper of the mountains sounds as an echo in the soul
 2006: The Syvash Rubicon
 2006: The Bukovina Dimension
 2007: Malaysia - on the Coast of the Ocean of the Future
 2007: Primeval Forests in the Center of Europe 
 2007: Slavutych - my native town
 2007: Knights of Mountains
 2008: Carpathian, First National
 2008: That’s the way it is (part one, about the causes and consequences of flooding in the Carpathian region)
 2008: Chalet for Horthy
 2009: Sheep, my sheep" 
 2011: Another Chernobyl 
 2011: Stuzhystsa's premiere 
 2012: Ukraine 20/21 (documentary) 
 2007 to 2008:  Monologues: Maecenas (series) 
 2007 to 2008: Molfar, the Carpathian sorcerer 
 2007 to 2008: Painter 
 2007 to 2008: Rescue 
 2009: Guardian of the Future 2010: Senior 

 Publications 
 The School of teaching and learning, an interview with Vasyl Kremen.
 Mountain ecological balance, an important factor in the prevention of emergency situations. A Balkan journey. That one, who is seated in Sarkofag, problems of the Ukryttia second unit. Nadzvychaina Sytuatsia magazine, 2002 issue 12. 
 Exclusion Zone, Moskovsky Komsomolets in Ukraine, weekly periodical, 2010 issue 17.
 Fears of insurance medicine, Moskovsky Komsomolets in Ukraine, 2010 issue 25. 
 Sheep, my sheep Moskovsky Komsomolets in Ukraine, 2010 issue 33. 
 The Other majority Moskovsky Komsomolets in Ukraine, 2010 issue 35.

 See also 
 Kintour Film Festival, Nadzvychaina sytuatsia magazine November 2007, 11(121). 
 Anatolii Matvyienko: Confidence, that's what we are in great need of.''
 Presentation of three projects of the National Deputies Association of Ukraine IUPDP organisation.

1957 births
Living people
Mass media people from Kyiv
Kyiv Polytechnic Institute alumni
Laureates of the Honorary Diploma of the Verkhovna Rada of Ukraine